Frontenac—Addington was a federal electoral district represented in the House of Commons of Canada from 1925 to 1953. It was located in the province of Ontario. This riding was created in 1924 from parts of Frontenac and Lennox and Addington ridings.

It initially consisted of the county of Frontenac (excluding the city of Kingston and the village of Portsmouth), and part of the county of Lennox and Addington lying east and north of and including the townships of Camden and Ernestown.

In 1933, the Lennox and Addington portion of the riding was redefined to consist of the county of Lennox and Addington excluding the townships of Ernestown, Fredericksburgh North and Fredericksburgh South, Richmond, Adolphustown and Amherst Island.

The electoral district was abolished in 1952 when it was redistributed between Hastings—Frontenac and Kingston ridings.

Members of Parliament

This riding elected the following members of the House of Commons of Canada:

Election results

|}

|}

On Mr. Edwards' death, 18 April 1929:

|}

|}

On Mr. Spankie's death, 27 May 1934:

|}

|}

On Mr. Campbell's resignation, 11 August 1937, in order to take part in the provincial elections:

|}

|}

|}

|}

See also 

 List of Canadian federal electoral districts
 Past Canadian electoral districts

External links 
Riding history from the Library of Parliament

Former federal electoral districts of Ontario